Sinibrama taeniatus is a species of ray-finned fish in the genus Sinibrama.

References 

Sinibrama
Fish described in 1941